Tom D. Miller is a United States Air Force lieutenant general who serves as the deputy chief of staff for logistics, engineering, and force protection of the U.S. Air Force. He previously commanded the Air Force Sustainment Center from 2021 to 2022.

Military career

In July 2021, Miller was nominated for promotion to lieutenant general and assignment as commander of the Air Force Sustainment Center, succeeding Lieutenant General Donald Kirkland. In April 2022, Miller was nominated for appointment as deputy chief of staff for logistics, engineering, and force protection of the United States Air Force.

Effective dates of promotions

References

 

 

Air Command and Staff College alumni
Embry–Riddle Aeronautical University
Living people
Place of birth missing (living people)
Recipients of the Legion of Merit
United States Air Force generals
United States Air Force personnel of the Iraq War
United States Air Force personnel of the War in Afghanistan (2001–2021)
University of Texas at Arlington alumni
Year of birth missing (living people)